M. N. Govindan Nair (10 December 1910 – 27 November 1984), popularly known as MN, was an Indian communist politician born in Pandalam, in Pathanamthitta district, India. He is known as "Kerala Khrushchev".

Political life

M.N. began his public life by involving himself in anti-caste struggles taking place in the locality. He was also associated with Nair Service Society in his early days.

M.N's political life got a fillip when he visited Wardha, and met with many national leaders including Jawaharlal Nehru. Later he joined the communist movement in Kerala. He was one of the foremost leaders of the Communist Party of India (CPI).

He was the General Secretary of the Communist Party of India (CPI), and it was under his secretaryship that CPI came to power in the 1957 General Elections in Kerala which made the path for the E.M.S. Namboothiripad Ministry of 1957–1959. In 1964 when Communist Party split he remained in the CPI. He was Member of Parliament, and served as the Minister of Kerala. He was elected to the Kerala Legislative Assembly in the General Elections of 1967 from Punalur  Constituency and re-elected to the Assembly from Chadayamangalam Constituency in 1971 General Election. He undertook portfolios like Minister for Agriculture, Transport, Electricity and Housing in the Fourth Kerala Legislative Assembly in the C. Achutha Menon Government from 4 October 1970 to 25 March 1977.

Major policies 
He was instrumental in pushing lot of radical and progressive policies and legislations in Kerala.

M.N. was responsible for launching the 'Laksham Veedu''' or One Lakh housing scheme project in 1972, aimed at providing housing for the under privileged. In his respect, the scheme is now named after him.https://shodhgangotri.inflibnet.ac.in/bitstream/123456789/5192/2/2_synopsis.pdf 

While being part of United Front (1970–1979, Kerala) he pushed legislations like Kerala Private Forests (Vesting and Assignment) Act, 1971'' which nationalised private forest in Malabar region, Kerala Land Reforms (Amendment) Act, 1969 etc.

References

1910 births
1984 deaths
Communist Party of India politicians from Kerala
People from Pathanamthitta district
India MPs 1977–1979
Lok Sabha members from Kerala
Recipients of the Kerala Sahitya Akademi Award
Indian independence activists from Kerala
Government Law College, Thiruvananthapuram alumni
Prisoners and detainees of British India